The Show is a 1995 American documentary film about hip hop music. It was directed by Brian Robbins and featured interviews with some of hip hop's biggest names. Def Jam founder Russell Simmons stars in and narrates the film. The film grossed $1,482,892 in its opening weekend and $2,702,578 during its theatrical run.

Cast 
 Afrika Bambaataa
 The Notorious B.I.G.
 Kurtis Blow
 Sean "Puffy" Combs
 Snoop Doggy Dogg
 Dr. Dre
 Warren G
 Andre Harrell of Uptown Records
 Kid Capri
 LL Cool J
 Craig Mack
 Method Man
 Melle Mel
 Naughty by Nature
 Raekwon
 Run-D.M.C.
 Slick Rick
 Russell Simmons
 Tha Dogg Pound
 Twinz
 Whodini
 Wu-Tang Clan

Soundtracks 

A soundtrack consisting entirely of hip hop was released on August 15, 1995 by Def Jam Recordings. The soundtrack was very successful, peaking at 4 on the Billboard 200 and 1 on the Top R&B/Hip-Hop Albums and was certified platinum on October 16, 1995.

References

External links 

1995 films
1995 documentary films
American documentary films
Concert films
Documentary films about hip hop music and musicians
Films scored by Stanley Clarke
Films directed by Brian Robbins
Rysher Entertainment films
Savoy Pictures films
1995 directorial debut films
1990s English-language films
1990s American films